Montrezl Dashay Harrell ((born January 26, 1994) is an American professional basketball player for the Philadelphia 76ers of the National Basketball Association (NBA). He played college basketball for the Louisville Cardinals. Harrell received the Karl Malone Award as the top power forward in the nation as a junior in 2015.  He was selected in the second round of the 2015 NBA draft by the Houston Rockets. He was traded to the Los Angeles Clippers in 2017 and was named NBA Sixth Man of the Year in 2020.

High school career
Harrell, a 6' 7" power forward from Tarboro, North Carolina, starred at North Edgecombe High School before prepping for a year at Hargrave Military Academy in Chatham, Virginia.  There he led the team to a 38–1 record while averaging 25.2 points and 13.6 rebounds per game.  Originally Harrell committed to play college basketball for coach Seth Greenberg at Virginia Tech, but after Greenberg was fired, Harrell was released from his commitment and chose Louisville.

College career
As a freshman, Harrell backed up power forward Chane Behanan, averaging 5.7 points and 3.6 rebounds in 16.2 minutes per game.  He played his best at the end of the season, scoring 20 points in the Cardinals' Big East Conference championship victory over Syracuse.  In his reserve role, Harrell helped the Cardinals win the 2013 NCAA championship, which was later vacated, to cap his freshman season.

With Gorgui Dieng's departure for the 2013 NBA draft, Harrell received recognition in the offseason leading to his sophomore year as one of the top returning players in the country.  The Sporting News selected Harrell to the preseason All-America third team in its 2013–14 college basketball preview magazine. He and teammate Russ Smith received postseason honors, being named to the American Athletic Conference's all-conference first team. Harrell was seen as a potential mid-to-late first-round pick in the 2014 NBA draft .

Harrell decided to stay for his junior season instead of opting for the NBA, and the Cardinals moved to the Atlantic Coast Conference (ACC). In the 2014–15 season, he averaged 15.7 points and 9.2 rebounds per game and was the inaugural winner of the Karl Malone Award, given to the nation's top power forward. He was also named second-team All-ACC.

Professional career

Houston Rockets (2015–2017)
On June 25, 2015, Harrell was selected by the Houston Rockets in the second round of the 2015 NBA draft with the 32nd overall pick. On September 19, 2015, he signed a three-year deal with the Rockets. He made his debut for the Rockets in the team's season opener against the Denver Nuggets on October 28, recording eight points and three rebounds in a 105–85 loss. Two days later, he scored 17 points in a loss to the Golden State Warriors. On November 13, he made his first career start, scoring five points in just under 13 minutes of action, as the Rockets were defeated by the Denver Nuggets 107–98. On March 28, 2016, Harrell received a five-game NBA D-League suspension without pay for pushing a game official. During his rookie season, he received multiple assignments to the Rio Grande Valley Vipers, the Rockets' D-League affiliate.

On November 2, 2016, Harrell had a 17-point, 10-rebound effort off the bench in a 118–99 win over the New York Knicks. On December 21, 2016, against the Phoenix Suns, Harrell made his first start of the season and second of his career. He scored 17 points as a result, tying a career high. On December 30, he set a new career high with 29 points in a 140–116 win over the Los Angeles Clippers. On January 8, 2017, he had 28 points in 26 minutes off the bench on 12-of-13 shooting in a 129–122 win over the Toronto Raptors.

Los Angeles Clippers (2017–2020)
On June 28, 2017, the Los Angeles Clippers acquired Harrell, Patrick Beverley, Sam Dekker, Darrun Hilliard, DeAndre Liggins, Lou Williams, Kyle Wiltjer and a 2018 first-round pick from the Houston Rockets in exchange for Chris Paul. On January 11, 2018, he scored a season-high 25 points in a 121–115 win over the Sacramento Kings.

On July 24, 2018, Harrell re-signed with the Clippers on a two-year, $12 million contract. On October 26, 2018, Harrell scored a career-high 30 points off the bench in a 133–113 win over the Houston Rockets. On February 22, 2019, he matched his career high with 30 points in a 112–106 win over the Memphis Grizzlies. Three days later, he set a new career high with 32 points in a 121–112 win over the Dallas Mavericks.

On November 6, 2019, Harrell set a new career high of 34 points, alongside 13 rebounds and five assists, in a 129–124 loss to the Milwaukee Bucks. On November 24, he again scored 34 points, alongside twelve rebounds, two assists and two blocks, in a 134–109 win over the New Orleans Pelicans. On January 5, 2020, Harrell scored 34 points, alongside six rebounds and three assists, in a 135–132 win over the New York Knicks. During the 2019–20 season, Harrell averaged career highs in points (18.6) and rebounds (7.1) per game. In September 2020, Harrell was named the NBA Sixth Man of the Year. The Clippers fell in seven games during the second round of the playoffs after the Denver Nuggets came back from a 3–1 deficit, despite a team-leading 20-point effort from Harrell in Game 7. Harrell averaged 10.5 points and 2.9 rebounds in the playoffs.

Los Angeles Lakers (2020–2021)
On November 22, 2020, Harrell signed a two-year, $19 million contract with the Los Angeles Lakers. On December 22, he made his Lakers debut, putting up 17 points, 10 rebounds, and three assists, in a 116–109 loss to the Los Angeles Clippers. On March 15, 2021, Harrell scored a season-high 27 points, alongside five rebounds and three steals, in a 128–97 win over the Golden State Warriors. In the first round of the playoffs, the Lakers fell in six games to the Phoenix Suns, with Harrell only averaging 9.8 minutes a game.

Washington Wizards (2021–2022) 
On August 6, 2021, Harrell was traded to the Washington Wizards as part of a package for Russell Westbrook. Harrell made his Wizards debut on October 20, recording 22 points and nine rebounds in a 98–83 win over the Toronto Raptors. On December 1, he scored a season-high 27 points, alongside five rebounds and three assists, in a 115–107 win over the Minnesota Timberwolves.

Charlotte Hornets (2022) 
On February 10, 2022, Harrell was traded to the Charlotte Hornets in exchange for Ish Smith, Vernon Carey Jr., and a 2023 second-round pick. On February 11, Harrell made his Hornets debut,  putting up 15 points and six rebounds in a 141–119 win over the Detroit Pistons.

Philadelphia 76ers (2022–present) 
On September 13, 2022, Harrell signed with the Philadelphia 76ers. He made his 76ers debut on October 18, scoring two points in a 126–117 loss to the Boston Celtics.

National team career
In 2012, Harrell was a member of the United States team at the FIBA Americas Under-18 Championship that won Gold in São Sebastião do Paraíso, Brazil.

NBA career statistics

Regular season

|-
| style="text-align:left;"| 
| style="text-align:left;"| Houston
| 39 || 1 || 9.7 || .644 || –  || .522 || 1.7 || .4 || .3 || .3 || 3.6
|-
| style="text-align:left;"| 
| style="text-align:left;"| Houston
| 58 || 14 || 18.3 || .652 || .143  || .628 || 3.8 || 1.1 || .3 || .7 || 9.1
|-
| style="text-align:left;"| 
| style="text-align:left;"| L.A. Clippers
| 76 || 3 || 17.0 || .635 || .143  || .626 || 4.0 || 1.0 || .5 || .7 || 11.0
|-
| style="text-align:left;"| 
| style="text-align:left;"| L.A. Clippers
| 82 || 5 || 26.3 || .615 || .176  || .643 || 6.5 || 2.0 || .9 || 1.3 || 16.6
|-
| style="text-align:left;"| 
| style="text-align:left;"| L.A. Clippers
| 63 || 2 || 27.8 || .580 || .000  || .658 || 7.1 || 1.7 || .6 || 1.1 || 18.6
|-
| style="text-align:left;"| 
| style="text-align:left;"| L.A. Lakers
| 69 || 1 || 22.9 || .622 || .000 || .707 || 6.2 || 1.1 || .7 || .7 || 13.5
|-
| style="text-align:left;"| 
| style="text-align:left;"| Washington
| 46 || 3 || 24.3 || .645 || .267 || .727 || 6.7 || 2.1 || .4 || .7 || 14.1
|-
| style="text-align:left;"| 
| style="text-align:left;"| Charlotte
| 25 || 0 || 21.0 || .645 || .000 || .692 || 4.9 || 2.0 || .4 || .5 || 11.4
|- class="sortbottom"
| style="text-align:center;" colspan="2"| Career
| 458 || 29 || 21.5 || .620 || .117 || .662 || 5.3 || 1.4 || .6 || .8 || 12.9

Playoffs

|-
| style="text-align:left;"| 2016
| style="text-align:left;"| Houston
| 2 || 0 || 6.0 || .333 || .000 || .500 || 1.0 || .0 || .0 || .0 || 1.5
|-
| style="text-align:left;"| 2017
| style="text-align:left;"| Houston
| 5 || 0 || 4.2 || .333 || – || .500 || 1.2 || .4 || .0 || .0 || 1.0
|-
| style="text-align:left;"| 2019
| style="text-align:left;"| L.A. Clippers
| 6 || 0 || 26.3 || .730 || .000 || .692|| 5.5 || 2.2 || .5 || .7 || 18.3
|-
| style="text-align:left;"| 2020
| style="text-align:left;"| L.A. Clippers
| 13 || 0 || 18.7 || .573 || .200 || .603 || 2.9 || .4 || .4 || .5 || 10.5
|-
| style="text-align:left;"| 2021
| style="text-align:left;"| L.A. Lakers
| 4 || 0 || 9.8 || .571 || .000 || .778 || 3.0 || .0 || .5 || .0 || 5.8
|- class="sortbottom"
| style="text-align:center;" colspan="2"| Career
| 30 || 0 || 15.8 || .624 || .143 || .631 || 3.0 || 0.7 || .3 || .4 || 9.2

Personal life
Harrell is the son of Samuel and Selena Harrell and has two younger brothers, Cadarius and Quatauis.

Harrell enjoys collecting and designing sneakers. Through social media, he finds sneaker customizers who can make his shoe designs a reality. Harrell wears different shoes during the first and second half of every basketball game. In August 2018, the NBA modified its shoe policy allowing NBA players to wear any colored shoes.

Harrell left the 2020 NBA Bubble in Walt Disney World for a family matter, which was later revealed to be to tend to his grandmother, who died soon after. He missed the first two games in the bubble as a result.

On June 15, 2022, Harrell was arrested and charged with trafficking less than five pounds of marijuana, a felony drug charge punishable with up to five years in prison. In August 2022, the crime was downgraded to a misdemeanor.

References

External links

Louisville Cardinals bio

1994 births
Living people
21st-century African-American sportspeople
African-American basketball players
American men's basketball players
Basketball players from North Carolina
Centers (basketball)
Charlotte Hornets players
Hargrave Military Academy alumni
Houston Rockets draft picks
Houston Rockets players
Los Angeles Clippers players
Los Angeles Lakers players
Louisville Cardinals men's basketball players
Philadelphia 76ers players
People from Tarboro, North Carolina  
Power forwards (basketball)
Rio Grande Valley Vipers players
Washington Wizards players